Fabbrica may refer to:

Fabbrica Curone, a comune in the Province of Alessandria, Piedmont, Italy
Fabbrica, Peccioli, a village in the province of Pisa, Italy
Fabbrica Aeroplani Ing. O. Pomilio, an Italian World War I biplane aircraft manufacturer
Fabbrica Italiana Automobili Torino
Veneranda Fabbrica del Duomo di Milano, an organization established to supervise construction of the Cathedral of Milan
Fabbrica d'Armi Pietro Beretta; see Beretta

See also
Fabrica (disambiguation)